Muhammad Luthfi Kamal Baharsyah (born 1 March 1999) is an Indonesian professional footballer who plays as a defensive midfielder for Liga 1 club PSIS Semarang.

Club career

Mitra Kukar
Was born in Jakarta, Luthfi started his professional career with Mitra Kukar in 2018. He made his professional debut on 27 July 2018 in a match against Arema at the Aji Imbut Stadium, Tenggarong

PSS Sleman
He was signed for PSS Sleman to play in Liga 1 in the 2020 season. This season was suspended on 27 March 2020 due to the COVID-19 pandemic. The season was abandoned and was declared void on 20 January 2021.

Barito Putera
In 2021, Lutfi Kamal signed a contract with Indonesian Liga 1 club Barito Putera. Luthfi made his debut on 4 September 2021 in a match against Persib Bandung.
 On 17 September, he scored his first goal for Barito Putera in a 1–1 draw over Borneo at the Wibawa Mukti Stadium.

PSIS Semarang
Luthfi Kamal became PSIS Semarang's second recruit in the first half of the 2022–23 Liga 1. PSIS CEO, Yoyok Sukawi explained that Luthfi Kamal was recruited to complete the players in the middle position. Luthfi made his professional debut on 16 January 2023 in a match against RANS Nusantara at the Pakansari Stadium, Bogor.

International career
On 31 May 2017, Luthfi made his debut against Brazil U20 in the 2017 Toulon Tournament in France. And Luthfi is one of the players that strengthen Indonesia U19 in 2018 AFC U-19 Championship.

Career statistics

Club

International goals
International under-23 goals

Honours

International 
Indonesia U-19
 AFF U-19 Youth Championship third place: 2017, 2018
Indonesia U-22
 AFF U-22 Youth Championship: 2019

References

External links
 Luthfi Kamal at Soccerway

1999 births
Living people
Indonesian footballers
Mitra Kukar players
PSS Sleman players
PS Barito Putera players
Liga 1 (Indonesia) players
Indonesia youth international footballers
Association football midfielders
Sportspeople from Jakarta